St. Martin's Church is a historic Catholic church building in Starkenburg, Montgomery County, Missouri in the Diocese of Jefferson City. It is now part of a religious complex near the Shrine of Our Lady of Sorrows.

History
German Catholic immigrants to the Missouri Rhineland had established a community here as early as 1852, worshiping in a log cabin. The stone church was constructed in 1873, with an addition and tower added in the 1890s.

The parish of St. Martin's at Starkenburg was merged in 1979 with St. Joseph's at Rhineland to form the Church of the Risen Savior in Rhineland, which continues to administer the site.

References

German-American culture in Missouri
Churches in the Roman Catholic Diocese of Jefferson City
Churches on the National Register of Historic Places in Missouri
Churches in Montgomery County, Missouri
Roman Catholic churches completed in 1873
Organizations disestablished in 1979
National Register of Historic Places in Montgomery County, Missouri
Starkenburg, Missouri
19th-century Roman Catholic church buildings in the United States